During the 2005–06 English football season, Southend United F.C. competed in the Football League One.

Season summary
In the 2005–06 season, Southend had another successful campaign and on 29 April 2006, the Shrimpers were promoted to the Football League Championship after a 2–2 draw with Swansea City at the Welsh club's new Liberty Stadium. Southend was crowned League One champions on 6 May 2006 after beating Bristol City 1–0 at Roots Hall in front of over 11,000 fans. This was the last professional appearance of Shaun Goater; fans from his former club Manchester City came to give him a special send-off at the end of a long and distinguished career. For Southend United, the title was the club's first in 25 years. On 6 May 2006, Tilson was named as the League Manager Association's Manager-of-the-Season for League One.

Final league table

Results
Southend United's score comes first

Legend

Football League One

FA Cup

League Cup

LDV Vans Trophy

Squad

Left club during season

References

Southend United F.C. seasons
Southend United F.C.